The Hotel District is a neighborhood in Downtown Atlanta, Georgia, United States. The district's name is derived from it being the home to many hotels, one of them being the famous Westin Peachtree Plaza Hotel. The Hotel District is generally considered to be bounded by the Downtown Connector to the east, Five Points to the south, Centennial Olympic Park to the west, and Midtown to the north. The district's primary thoroughfare is Peachtree Street, which contains most of the restaurants, hotels, and office buildings. The intersection of Andrew Young International Boulevard and Peachtree Street forms the heart of the district.

Hotels 
 
As its name suggests, the Hotel District is the home of many of Atlanta's signature hotels. Tourists coming to Atlanta for conventions typically stay in the hotels located in this district. Some of those hotels include:

Westin Peachtree Plaza Hotel
Atlanta Marriott Marquis
Hyatt Regency Atlanta
Ritz Carlton
W Hotel
Atlanta Sheraton
The Glenn
Omni Hotel
Hilton Atlanta
The Ellis
Embassy Suites Atlanta
Renaissance Hotel

All of these hotels are located in walking distance to many of Atlanta's tourist attractions, such as the Georgia Aquarium, World of Coca-Cola, Centennial Olympic Park, and the CNN Center, as well as other facilities such as State Farm Arena, Georgia World Congress Center, and Mercedes-Benz Stadium.

References

External links

Neighborhoods in Atlanta